DXCM (97.9 FM), broadcasting as 97.9 Love Radio, is a radio station owned and operated by Manila Broadcasting Company. The station's studio and transmitter are located at the 4th Floor, Jose Go Huilo Bldg., Tomas Claudio St., Zamboanga City.

History
DXCM was inaugurated on October 12, 1990, as Love Radio, carrying an easy listening format. In the early years, DXCM carried live news broadcast from DZRH and plays classic, OPM and pop music. It also aired "Love Radio Top 30 Countdown" and the "Afternoon Radio Show" in the mid-1990s. In 2000, it switched to a mass-based format.

In late 2008, lack of resources and financial challenges led to Love Radio's closure of air-time operations. On July 8, 2009, DXCM returned on air, this time as Easy Rock. Shai Tisai, who is currently part of Easy Rock Manila, started her career in the station as Bea.

On February 26, 2014, DXCM returned the Love Radio brand, coinciding with the rebranding of sister station DXHT as Yes FM.

References

External links
Love Radio Zamboanga FB Page
Love Radio Zamboanga Website

Radio stations in Zamboanga City
Radio stations established in 1990
Love Radio Network stations